Stenoplastis dyeri is a moth of the family Notodontidae. It is found on the eastern side of the Andes in Ecuador.

The length of the forewings is 11.5–12 mm for males and 13 mm for females. The ground color of the forewings is dark brown to blackish brown. The ground color of the hindwings is dark brown to blackish brown, slightly lighter in tone than the forewings. The anterior margin is lighter gray-brown in the basal two-thirds.

The larvae feed on Geonoma orbignyana.

Etymology
The species is named in honor of Lee Dyer, who discovered the larvae of this species feeding on an understory palm.

References

Moths described in 2008
Notodontidae of South America